I Think You Should Leave with Tim Robinson is an American sketch comedy series created by Tim Robinson and Zach Kanin, with Robinson also starring in most of the sketches. The first season premiered on Netflix on April 23, 2019, while the second season was released on July 6, 2021. The series was renewed for a third season in May 2022, which is scheduled to premiere on May 30, 2023.

Synopsis
Most of the sketches revolve around someone making an embarrassing mistake in a social or professional setting, then refusing to admit to it and instead stubbornly attempting to convince everyone that they are right and the people around them are wrong. The series leans heavily on cringe comedy, with elements of surreal humor. It also incorporates toilet humor, though this often serves to be subverted in unexpected ways.

Production
The series is executive produced by Robinson and Kanin alongside Lonely Island members Andy Samberg, Akiva Schaffer and Jorma Taccone. Guest stars include Samberg, Vanessa Bayer, Kate Berlant, Julia Butters, Will Forte, Patti Harrison, Paul Walter Hauser, Tim Heidecker, Conner O'Malley, Bob Odenkirk, Sam Richardson, Cecily Strong, Brandon Wardell, Fred Willard and Steven Yeun. The first season premiered on April 23, 2019.

After the release of the first season, the series was renewed for a second season on June 19, 2019. Production on the second season was delayed by the COVID-19 pandemic. It was eventually released on July 6, 2021. The series was renewed for a third season on May 6, 2022 which is scheduled to premiere on May 30, 2023.

Episodes

Season 1 (2019)

Season 2 (2021)

Reception 
On Rotten Tomatoes, the first season holds a 96% approval rating with an average rating of 7.6 out of 10, based on 25 reviews. The website's critical consensus reads, "A gloriously absurd journey into the mind of Tim Robinson, I Think You Should Leaves bazaar of surreal skits breathes new life into the world of TV sketch-comedy." On Metacritic, the first season has a 72 out of 100 rating from 4 reviews, indicating "generally favorable reviews."

On Rotten Tomatoes, the second season holds a 100% approval rating with an average rating of 8.8 out of 10, based on 28 reviews. The website's critical consensus reads, "A triumph of sketch comedy, I Think You Should Leaves sophomore season dives deeper into Tim Robinson and Zach Kanin's strange minds with manically delightful results." On Metacritic, the second season has an 87 out of 100 rating from 11 reviews, indicating "universal acclaim."

Ben Travers of IndieWire described the series as "demented" and "outlandish," but ultimately "pretty great". Fran Hoepfner of Vulture called the show "comedy perfection," writing that it is "silly, grotesque, loud, and absurd. What more could you want, really?" In a less positive review, Joel Keller wrote in Decider that the series was "more miss than hit."

In April 2021, Wired contributing editor Peter Rubin wrote that he had become obsessed with I Think You Should Leave, having watched the whole first season at least 100 times. He wrote that the show's sketches tend to revolve around "a character who is gloriously, spectacularly wrong—yet refuses to budge, lest they be humiliated by copping to their own wrongness" and that thus the show "isn't just a distillation of our personal insecurities, it's a condemnation of facade. It's an antidote, in other words, to the internet itself."

Accolades

References

External links 
 
 

English-language Netflix original programming
2010s American sketch comedy television series
2019 American television series debuts
Primetime Emmy Award-winning television series
Television productions postponed due to the COVID-19 pandemic